Human–computer interaction (HCI) is research in the design and the use of computer technology, which focuses on the interfaces between people (users) and computers. HCI researchers observe the ways humans interact with computers and design technologies that allow humans to interact with computers in novel ways. A device that allows interaction between human being and a computer is known as a "Human-computer Interface (HCI)".

As a field of research, human–computer interaction is situated at the intersection of computer science, behavioral sciences, design, media studies, and several other fields of study. The term was popularized by Stuart K. Card, Allen Newell, and Thomas P. Moran in their 1983 book, The Psychology of Human–Computer Interaction. The first known use was in 1975 by Carlisle. The term is intended to convey that, unlike other tools with specific and limited uses, computers have many uses which often involve an open-ended dialogue between the user and the computer. The notion of dialogue likens human–computer interaction to human-to-human interaction: an analogy that is crucial to theoretical considerations in the field.

Introduction

Humans interact with computers in many ways, and the interface between the two is crucial to facilitating this interaction. HCI is also sometimes termed human–machine interaction (HMI), man-machine interaction (MMI) or computer-human interaction (CHI). Desktop applications, internet browsers, handheld computers, and computer kiosks make use of the prevalent graphical user interfaces (GUI) of today. Voice user interfaces (VUI) are used for speech recognition and synthesizing systems, and the emerging multi-modal and Graphical user interfaces (GUI) allow humans to engage with embodied character agents in a way that cannot be achieved with other interface paradigms. The growth in human–computer interaction field has led to an increase in the quality of interaction, and resulted in many new areas of research beyond. Instead of designing regular interfaces, the different research branches focus on the concepts of multimodality over unimodality, intelligent adaptive interfaces over command/action based ones, and active interfaces over passive interfaces.

The Association for Computing Machinery (ACM) defines human–computer interaction as "a discipline that is concerned with the design, evaluation, and implementation of interactive computing systems for human use and with the study of major phenomena surrounding them". An important facet of HCI is user satisfaction (or End-User Computing Satisfaction). It goes on to say:

"Because human–computer interaction studies a human and a machine in communication, it draws from supporting knowledge on both the machine and the human side. On the machine side, techniques in computer graphics, operating systems, programming languages, and development environments are relevant. On the human side, communication theory, graphic and industrial design disciplines, linguistics, social sciences, cognitive psychology, social psychology, and human factors such as computer user satisfaction are relevant. And, of course, engineering and design methods are relevant."

Due to the multidisciplinary nature of HCI, people with different backgrounds contribute to its success.

Poorly designed human-machine interfaces can lead to many unexpected problems. A classic example is the Three Mile Island accident, a nuclear meltdown accident, where investigations concluded that the design of the human-machine interface was at least partly responsible for the disaster. Similarly, accidents in aviation have resulted from manufacturers' decisions to use non-standard flight instruments or throttle quadrant layouts: even though the new designs were proposed to be superior in basic human-machine interaction, pilots had already ingrained the "standard" layout. Thus, the conceptually good idea had unintended results.

Human–computer interface

The human–computer interface can be described as the point of communication between the human user and the computer. The flow of information between the human and computer is defined as the loop of interaction. The loop of interaction has several aspects to it, including:

 Visual Based: The visual-based human–computer interaction is probably the most widespread human–computer interaction (HCI) research area.
 Audio Based: The audio-based interaction between a computer and a human is another important area of HCI systems. This area deals with information acquired by different audio signals.
 Task environment: The conditions and goals set upon the user.
 Machine environment: The computer's environment is connected to, e.g., a laptop in a college student's dorm room.
 Areas of the interface: Non-overlapping areas involve the processes related to humans and computers themselves, while the overlapping areas only involve the processes related to their interaction.
 Input flow: The flow of information begins in the task environment when the user has some task requiring using their computer.
 Output: The flow of information that originates in the machine environment.
 Feedback: Loops through the interface that evaluate, moderate, and confirm processes as they pass from the human through the interface to the computer and back.
 Fit: This matches the computer design, the user, and the task to optimize the human resources needed to accomplish the task.

Goals for computers
Human–computer interaction studies the ways in which humans make—or do not make—use of computational artifacts, systems, and infrastructures. Much of the research in this field seeks to improve the human–computer interaction by improving the usability of computer interfaces. How usability is to be precisely understood, how it relates to other social and cultural values, and when it is, and when it may not be a desirable property of computer interfaces is increasingly debated.

Much of the research in the field of human–computer interaction takes an interest in:

 Methods for designing new computer interfaces, thereby optimizing a design for a desired property such as learnability, findability, the efficiency of use.
 Methods for implementing interfaces, e.g., by means of software libraries.
 Methods for evaluating and comparing interfaces with respect to their usability and other desirable properties.
 Methods for studying human–computer use and its sociocultural implications more broadly.
 Methods for determining whether or not the user is human or computer.
 Models and theories of human–computer use as well as conceptual frameworks for the design of computer interfaces, such as cognitivist user models, Activity Theory, or ethnomethodological accounts of human–computer use.
 Perspectives that critically reflect upon the values that underlie computational design, computer use, and HCI research practice.

Visions of what researchers in the field seek to achieve might vary. When pursuing a cognitivist perspective, researchers of HCI may seek to align computer interfaces with the mental model that humans have of their activities. When pursuing a post-cognitivist perspective, researchers of HCI may seek to align computer interfaces with existing social practices or existing sociocultural values.

Researchers in HCI are interested in developing design methodologies, experimenting with devices, prototyping software and hardware systems, exploring interaction paradigms, and developing models and theories of interaction.

Design

Principles

The following experimental design principles are considered, when evaluating a current user interface, or designing a new user interface:
 Early focus is placed on the user(s) and task(s): How many users are needed to perform the task(s) is established and who the appropriate users should be is determined (someone who has never used the interface, and will not use the interface in the future, is most likely not a valid user). In addition, the task(s) the users will be performing and how often the task(s) need to be performed is defined.
 Empirical measurement: the interface is tested with real users who come in contact with the interface daily. The results can vary with the performance level of the user and the typical human–computer interaction may not always be represented. Quantitative usability specifics, such as the number of users performing the task(s), the time to complete the task(s), and the number of errors made during the task(s) are determined.
 Iterative design: After determining what users, tasks, and empirical measurements to include, the following iterative design steps are performed:
 Design the user interface
 Test
 Analyze results
 Repeat
The iterative design process is repeated until a sensible, user-friendly interface is created.

Methodologies
Various strategies delineating methods for human–PC interaction design have developed since the conception of the field during the 1980s. Most plan philosophies come from a model for how clients, originators, and specialized frameworks interface. Early techniques treated clients' psychological procedures as unsurprising and quantifiable and urged plan specialists to look at subjective science to establish zones, (for example, memory and consideration) when structuring UIs. Present-day models, in general, center around a steady input and discussion between clients, creators, and specialists and push for specialized frameworks to be folded with the sorts of encounters clients need to have, as opposed to wrapping user experience around a finished framework.

 Activity theory: utilized in HCI to characterize and consider the setting where human cooperations with PCs occur. Action hypothesis gives a structure for reasoning about activities in these specific circumstances and illuminates the design of interactions from an action-driven perspective.
 User-centered design (UCD): a cutting-edge, broadly-rehearsed plan theory established on the possibility that clients must become the overwhelming focus in the plan of any PC framework. Clients, architects, and specialized experts cooperate to determine the requirements and restrictions of the client and make a framework to support these components. Frequently, client-focused plans are informed by ethnographic investigations of situations in which clients will associate with the framework. This training is like participatory design, which underscores the likelihood for end-clients to contribute effectively through shared plan sessions and workshops.
 Principles of UI design: these standards may be considered during the design of a client interface: resistance, effortlessness, permeability, affordance, consistency, structure, and feedback.
 Value sensitive design (VSD): a technique for building innovation that accounts for the individuals who utilize the design straightforwardly, and just as well for those who the design influences, either directly or indirectly. VSD utilizes an iterative planning process that includes three kinds of examinations: theoretical, exact, and specialized. Applied examinations target the understanding and articulation of the different parts of the design, and its qualities or any clashes that may emerge for the users of the design. Exact examinations are subjective or quantitative plans to explore things used to advise the creators' understanding regarding the clients' qualities, needs, and practices. Specialized examinations can include either investigation of how individuals use related advances or the framework plans.

Display designs
Displays are human-made artifacts designed to support the perception of relevant system variables and facilitate further processing of that information. Before a display is designed, the task that the display is intended to support must be defined (e.g., navigating, controlling, decision making, learning, entertaining, etc.). A user or operator must be able to process whatever information a system generates and displays; therefore, the information must be displayed according to principles to support perception, situation awareness, and understanding.

Thirteen principles of display design
Christopher Wickens et al. defined 13 principles of display design in their book An Introduction to Human Factors Engineering.

These principles of human perception and information processing can be utilized to create an effective display design. A reduction in errors, a reduction in required training time, an increase in efficiency, and an increase in user satisfaction are a few of the many potential benefits that can be achieved by utilizing these principles.

Certain principles may not apply to different displays or situations. Some principles may also appear to be conflicting, and there is no simple solution to say that one principle is more important than another. The principles may be tailored to a specific design or situation. Striking a functional balance among the principles is critical for an effective design.

Perceptual principles

1.	Make displays legible (or audible). A display's legibility is critical and necessary for designing a usable display. If the characters or objects being displayed cannot be discernible, the operator cannot effectively use them.

2.	Avoid absolute judgment limits. Do not ask the user to determine the level of a variable based on a single sensory variable (e.g., color, size, loudness). These sensory variables can contain many possible levels.

3.	Top-down processing. Signals are likely perceived and interpreted by what is expected based on a user's experience. If a signal is presented contrary to the user's expectation, more physical evidence of that signal may need to be presented to assure that it is understood correctly.

4.	Redundancy gain. If a signal is presented more than once, it is more likely to be understood correctly. This can be done by presenting the signal in alternative physical forms (e.g., color and shape, voice and print, etc.), as redundancy does not imply repetition. A traffic light is a good example of redundancy, as color and position are redundant.

5.	Similarity causes confusion: Use distinguishable elements. Signals that appear to be similar will likely be confused. The ratio of similar features to different features causes signals to be similar. For example, A423B9 is more similar to A423B8 than 92 is to 93. Unnecessarily similar features should be removed, and dissimilar features should be highlighted.

Mental model principles

6.	Principle of pictorial realism. A display should look like the variable that it represents (e.g., the high temperature on a thermometer shown as a higher vertical level). If there are multiple elements, they can be configured in a manner that looks like they would in the represented environment.

7.	Principle of the moving part. Moving elements should move in a pattern and direction compatible with the user's mental model of how it actually moves in the system. For example, the moving element on an altimeter should move upward with increasing altitude.

Principles based on attention
8.	Minimizing information access cost or interaction cost. When the user's attention is diverted from one location to another to access necessary information, there is an associated cost in time or effort. A display design should minimize this cost by allowing frequently accessed sources to be located at the nearest possible position. However, adequate legibility should not be sacrificed to reduce this cost.

9.	Proximity compatibility principle. Divided attention between two information sources may be necessary for the completion of one task. These sources must be mentally integrated and are defined to have close mental proximity. Information access costs should be low, which can be achieved in many ways (e.g., proximity, linkage by common colors, patterns, shapes, etc.). However, close display proximity can be harmful by causing too much clutter.

10.	Principle of multiple resources. A user can more easily process information across different resources. For example, visual and auditory information can be presented simultaneously rather than presenting all visual or all auditory information.

Memory principles

11.	Replace memory with visual information: knowledge in the world. A user should not need to retain important information solely in working memory or retrieve it from long-term memory. A menu, checklist, or another display can aid the user by easing the use of their memory. However, memory use may sometimes benefit the user by eliminating the need to reference some knowledge globally (e.g., an expert computer operator would rather use direct commands from memory than refer to a manual). The use of knowledge in a user's head and knowledge in the world must be balanced for an effective design.

12.	Principle of predictive aiding. Proactive actions are usually more effective than reactive actions. A display should eliminate resource-demanding cognitive tasks and replace them with simpler perceptual tasks to reduce the user's mental resources. This will allow the user to focus on current conditions and to consider possible future conditions. An example of a predictive aid is a road sign displaying the distance to a certain destination.

13.	Principle of consistency. Old habits from other displays will easily transfer to support the processing of new displays if they are designed consistently. A user's long-term memory will trigger actions that are expected to be appropriate. A design must accept this fact and utilize consistency among different displays.

Current research

Topics in human–computer interaction include the following:

Social computing

Social computing is an interactive and collaborative behavior considered between technology and people. In recent years, there has been an explosion of social science research focusing on interactions as the unit of analysis, as there are a lot of social computing technologies that include blogs, emails,  social networking, quick messaging, and various others. Much of this research draws from psychology, social psychology, and sociology. For example, one study found out that people expected a computer with a man's name to cost more than a machine with a woman's name. Other research finds that individuals perceive their interactions with computers more negatively than humans, despite behaving the same way towards these machines.

Knowledge-driven human–computer interaction
In human and computer interactions, a semantic gap usually exists between human and computer's understandings towards mutual behaviors. Ontology, as a formal representation of domain-specific knowledge, can be used to address this problem by solving the semantic ambiguities between the two parties.

Emotions and human–computer interaction

In the interaction of humans and computers, research has studied how computers can detect, process, and react to human emotions to develop emotionally intelligent information systems. Researchers have suggested several 'affect-detection channels'. The potential of telling human emotions in an automated and digital fashion lies in improvements to the effectiveness of human–computer interaction. The influence of emotions in human–computer interaction has been studied in fields such as financial decision-making using ECG and organizational knowledge sharing using eye-tracking and face readers as affect-detection channels. In these fields, it has been shown that affect-detection channels have the potential to detect human emotions and those information systems can incorporate the data obtained from affect-detection channels to improve decision models.

Brain–computer interfaces

A brain–computer interface (BCI), is a direct communication pathway between an enhanced or wired brain and an external device. BCI differs from neuromodulation in that it allows for bidirectional information flow. BCIs are often directed at researching, mapping, assisting, augmenting, or repairing human cognitive or sensory-motor functions.

Security interactions
Security interactions are the study of interaction between humans and computers specifically as it pertains to information security.  Its aim, in plain terms, is to improve the usability of security features in end user applications.  

Unlike HCI, which has roots in the early days of Xerox PARC during the 1970s, HCISec is a nascent field of study by comparison. Interest in this topic tracks with that of Internet security, which has become an area of broad public concern only in very recent years.

When security features exhibit poor usability, the following are common reasons:

 they were added in casual afterthought
 they were hastily patched in to address newly discovered security bugs
 they address very complex use cases without the benefit of a software wizard
 their interface designers lacked understanding of related security concepts
 their interface designers were not usability experts (often meaning they were the application developers themselves)

Factors of change
Traditionally, computer use was modeled as a human–computer dyad in which the two were connected by a narrow explicit communication channel, such as text-based terminals. Much work has been done to make the interaction between a computing system and a human more reflective of the multidimensional nature of everyday communication. Because of potential issues, human–computer interaction shifted focus beyond the interface to respond to observations as articulated by D. Engelbart: "If ease of use were the only valid criterion, people would stick to tricycles and never try bicycles."

How humans interact with computers continues to evolve rapidly. Human–computer interaction is affected by developments in computing. These forces include:

 Decreasing hardware costs leading to larger memory and faster systems
 Miniaturization of hardware leading to portability
 Reduction in power requirements leading to portability
 New display technologies leading to the packaging of computational devices in new forms
 Specialized hardware leading to new functions
 Increased development of network communication and distributed computing
 Increasingly widespread use of computers, especially by people who are outside of the computing profession
 Increasing innovation in input techniques (e.g., voice, gesture, pen), combined with lowering cost, leading to rapid computerization by people formerly left out of the computer revolution.
 Wider social concerns leading to improved access to computers by currently disadvantaged groups

 the future for HCI is expected to include the following characteristics:

 Ubiquitous computing and communication. Computers are expected to communicate through high-speed local networks, nationally over wide-area networks, and portably via infrared, ultrasonic, cellular, and other technologies. Data and computational services will be portably accessible from many if not most locations to which a user travels.
 high-functionality systems. Systems can have large numbers of functions associated with them. There are so many systems that most users, technical or non-technical, do not have time to learn about traditionally (e.g., through thick user manuals).
 The mass availability of computer graphics. Computer graphics capabilities such as image processing, graphics transformations, rendering, and interactive animation become widespread as inexpensive chips become available for inclusion in general workstations and mobile devices.
 Mixed media. Commercial systems can handle images, voice, sounds, video, text, formatted data. These are exchangeable over communication links among users. The separate consumer electronics fields (e.g., stereo sets, DVD players, televisions) and computers are beginning to merge. Computer and print fields are expected to cross-assimilate.
 High-bandwidth interaction. The rate at which humans and machines interact is expected to increase substantially due to the changes in speed, computer graphics, new media, and new input/output devices. This can lead to qualitatively different interfaces, such as virtual reality or computational video.
 Large and thin displays. New display technologies are maturing, enabling huge displays and displays that are thin, lightweight, and low in power use. This has large effects on portability and will likely enable developing paper-like, pen-based computer interaction systems very different in feel from present desktop workstations.
 Information utilities. Public information utilities (such as home banking and shopping) and specialized industry services (e.g., weather for pilots) are expected to proliferate. The proliferation rate can accelerate with the introduction of high-bandwidth interaction and the improvement in the quality of interfaces.

Scientific conferences
One of the main conferences for new research in human–computer interaction is the annually held Association for Computing Machinery's (ACM) Conference on Human Factors in Computing Systems, usually referred to by its short name CHI (pronounced kai, or Khai). CHI is organized by ACM Special Interest Group on Computer-Human Interaction (SIGCHI). CHI is a large conference, with thousands of attendants, and is quite broad in scope. It is attended by academics, practitioners, and industry people, with company sponsors such as Google, Microsoft, and PayPal.

There are also dozens of other smaller, regional, or specialized HCI-related conferences held around the world each year, including:

 ACEICFAASRS: ACE – International Conference on Future Applications of AI, Sensors, and Robotics in Society
 ASSETS: ACM International Conference on Computers and Accessibility
 CSCW: ACM conference on Computer Supported Cooperative Work
 CC: Aarhus decennial conference on Critical Computing
 CUI: ACM conference on Conversational User Interfaces
 DIS: ACM conference on Designing Interactive Systems
 ECSCW: European Conference on Computer-Supported Cooperative Work
 GROUP: ACM conference on supporting group work
 HRI: ACM/IEEE International Conference on Human–robot interaction
 HCII: Human–Computer Interaction International
 ICMI: International Conference on Multimodal Interfaces
 ITS: ACM conference on Interactive Tabletops and Surfaces
 MobileHCI: International Conference on Human–Computer Interaction with Mobile Devices and Services
 NIME: International Conference on New Interfaces for Musical Expression
 OzCHI: Australian Conference on Human–Computer Interaction
 TEI: International Conference on Tangible, Embedded and Embodied Interaction
 Ubicomp: International Conference on Ubiquitous computing
 UIST: ACM Symposium on User Interface Software and Technology
 i-USEr: International Conference on User Science and Engineering
 INTERACT: IFIP TC13 Conference on Human–Computer Interaction
 IHCI: International Conference on Intelligent Human–Computer Interaction

See also
 
 Outline of human–computer interaction
 Information design
 Information architecture
 User experience design
 Mindfulness and technology
 CAPTCHA
 Digital Live Art
 Turing test
 HCI Bibliography, a web-based project to provide a bibliography of Human Computer Interaction literature

Footnotes

Further reading

 Academic overviews of the field
 Julie A. Jacko (Ed.). (2012). Human–Computer Interaction Handbook (3rd Edition). CRC Press. 
 Andrew Sears and Julie A. Jacko (Eds.). (2007). Human–Computer Interaction Handbook (2nd Edition). CRC Press. 
 Julie A. Jacko and Andrew Sears (Eds.). (2003). Human–Computer Interaction Handbook. Mahwah: Lawrence Erlbaum & Associates. 
 Dix, A. (2004). Human-computer interaction (3rd ed.). Pearson Education. 

 Historically important classic
 Stuart K. Card, Thomas P. Moran, Allen Newell (1983): The Psychology of Human–Computer Interaction. Erlbaum, Hillsdale 1983 

 Overviews of history of the field
 Jonathan Grudin: A moving target: The evolution of human–computer interaction. In Andrew Sears and Julie A. Jacko (Eds.). (2007). Human–Computer Interaction Handbook (2nd Edition). CRC Press. 
 
 John M. Carroll: Human–Computer Interaction: History and Status. Encyclopedia Entry at Interaction-Design.org
 
 Sara Candeias, S. and A. Veiga The dialogue between man and machine: the role of language theory and technology, Sandra M. Aluísio & Stella E. O. Tagnin, New Language Technologies, and Linguistic Research, A Two-Way Road: cap. 11. Cambridge Scholars Publishing.

Social science and HCI
 
 
 
 

Academic journals
 ACM Transactions on Computer-Human Interaction
 Behaviour & Information Technology 
 Interacting with Computers
 International Journal of Human-Computer Interaction
 International Journal of Human-Computer Studies
 Human–Computer Interaction  

 Collection of papers
 Ronald M. Baecker, Jonathan Grudin, William A. S. Buxton, Saul Greenberg (Eds.) (1995): Readings in human–computer interaction. Toward the Year 2000. 2. ed. Morgan Kaufmann, San Francisco 1995 
Mithun Ahamed, Developing a Message Interface Architecture for Android Operating Systems, (2015). 

 Treatments by one or few authors, often aimed at a more general audience
 Jakob Nielsen: Usability Engineering. Academic Press, Boston 1993 
 Donald A. Norman: The Psychology of Everyday Things. Basic Books, New York 1988 
 Jef Raskin: The Humane Interface. New directions for designing interactive systems. Addison-Wesley, Boston 2000 
 Bruce Tognazzini: Tog on Interface. Addison-Wesley, Reading 1991 

 Textbooks
 Alan Dix, Janet Finlay, Gregory Abowd, and Russell Beale (2003): Human–Computer Interaction. 3rd Edition. Prentice Hall, 2003. http://hcibook.com/e3/ 
 Yvonne Rogers, Helen Sharp & Jenny Preece: Interaction Design: Beyond Human–Computer Interaction, 3rd ed. John Wiley & Sons Ltd., 2011 
 Helen Sharp, Yvonne Rogers & Jenny Preece: Interaction Design: Beyond Human–Computer Interaction, 2nd ed. John Wiley & Sons Ltd., 2007 
 Matt Jones (interaction designer) and Gary Marsden (2006). Mobile Interaction Design, John Wiley and Sons Ltd.

External links

Bad Human Factors Designs
The HCI Wiki Bibliography with over 100,000 publications.
The HCI Bibliography Over 100,000 publications about HCI.
Human-Centered Computing Education Digital Library
HCI Webliography